Fountain Correctional Center may refer to these prisons:
 Fountain Correctional Center for Women (closed)
 Fountain Correctional Facility in Alabama